The canton of Peyre en Aubrac (before March 2020: canton of Aumont-Aubrac) is an administrative division of the Lozère department, southern France. Its borders were modified at the French canton reorganisation which came into effect in March 2015. Its seat is in Peyre en Aubrac.

It consists of the following communes:

Albaret-le-Comtal
Arzenc-d'Apcher
Les Bessons
Brion
Le Buisson
Chauchailles
La Fage-Montivernoux
La Fage-Saint-Julien
Fournels
Grandvals
Les Hermaux
Marchastel
Les Monts-Verts
Nasbinals
Noalhac
Peyre en Aubrac
Prinsuéjols-Malbouzon
Recoules-d'Aubrac
Saint-Juéry
Saint-Laurent-de-Muret
Saint-Laurent-de-Veyrès
Saint-Pierre-de-Nogaret
Les Salces
Termes
Trélans

References

Cantons of Lozère